Theo Perret (6 July 1915 – 26 July 2008) was a Swiss racing cyclist. He rode in the 1938 Tour de France.

References

External links
 

1915 births
2008 deaths
Swiss male cyclists
Place of birth missing
Tour de Suisse stage winners